Palestina is a municipality in the state of Alagoas in Brazil. The population is 5,037 (2020 est.) in an area of 38.21 km. The elevation is 160 m.

References

Municipalities in Alagoas